BMX Simulator is a racing video game designed by Richard Darling and released by Codemasters in 1986 for the Commodore 64. It is part of a series of games that includes ATV Simulator, Grand Prix Simulator, Professional Ski Simulator, and a sequel: Professional BMX Simulator.  BMX Simulator was ported to the Amiga, Atari 8-bit family, Atari ST, Amstrad CPC, MSX, ZX Spectrum, Commodore Plus/4 and Commodore 16.

Gameplay

BMX Simulator is an overhead race game similar to the arcade video game Super Sprint. The player must race against another player, or the computer, around a series of seven different bicycle motocross (BMX) tracks. There is also a time limit to be beaten. Only two cyclists can compete in each race. The race can be viewed in slow-motion instant replay afterward.

Reception

Sinclair User called it "a classy conversion from the Commodore original" and a "full price game in budget clothing".

ZX Computing said it was fun from start to finish, and rated it a Monster Hit.

Legacy
BMX Simulator was followed by a sequel in 1988,  Professional BMX Simulator, by the Oliver Twins. It was later rereleased as BMX Simulator 2.

References

External links
BMX Simulator at Lemon 64
BMX Simulator for the Atari 8-bit family at Atari Mania

BMX Simulator at Lemon Amiga

1986 video games
ZX Spectrum games
Commodore 64 games
Amstrad CPC games
Amiga games
Atari 8-bit family games
Atari ST games
BMX video games
Codemasters games
Cycling video games
Extreme sports video games
MSX games
Commodore 16 and Plus/4 games
Multiplayer and single-player video games
Video games scored by David Whittaker
Video games developed in the United Kingdom